The Bibliographic Association of the Red River (BARR) is a consortium of four independent libraries in Grayson County, Texas. The consortium was formed for patrons to access resources from the combined libraries. A valid library card from any of the member libraries, and TexShare Card holders, can be used at any other BARR member library.

Members
BARR library membership consists of two municipal, a community college, and private-university.

 Austin College Abell Library
 Denison Public Library
 Grayson College Library
 Sherman Public Library

References

External links
 Official website
 Abell Library at Austin College
 Denison Public Library
 Grayson College Library
 Sherman Public Library

 
Library consortia in Texas